The Gonini People’s Party is a centre-wing populist political party in Suriname. It was established by Chairman and Party Leader Siegfried Jalink Sr. to contest the upcoming elections constitutionally due in 2025.

References

External links 
 

Political parties established in 2020
Political parties in Suriname